A Galician Dances the Mambo (Spanish: Una gallega baila mambo) is a 1951 Mexican comedy film directed by Emilio Gómez Muriel and starring Niní Marshall, Joaquín Pardavé and Silvia Pinal.

Cast 
 Niní Marshall as Cándida
 Joaquín Pardavé as Cleofas Martínez
 Silvia Pinal as Carmina
 Pepe del Río as Gilberto Sánchez
 Miguel Arenas as don Fernando de la Colina 
 José Pulido as Ricardo 
 Antonio Bravo as Martín, mayordomo
 Celia Viveros as Maurelia
 Los Panchos as Themselves
 Toña la Negra as Cantante
 Víctor Alcocer as Jefe de chofer
 José Baviera as don Leoncio
 María Gentil Arcos as Compañera de juego de Cándida
 Ana María Hernández as Invitada a graduación
 Elodia Hernández as doña Gertrudis
 Francisco Pando as don Fabián
 Aurora Walker as Señorita directora

References

Bibliography 
 Posadas, Abel. Niní Marshall: desde un ayer lejano. Ediciones Colihue SRL, 1993.

External links 
 

1951 films
1951 comedy films
Mexican comedy films
1950s Spanish-language films
Films directed by Emilio Gómez Muriel
Mexican black-and-white films
1950s Mexican films